Yuba Bicycles is a bicycle manufacturer based in San Juan Capistrano, California. The company is known for making pedal and electric powered cargo bikes.

History

Early history 
In 2006, the company was founded by Benjamin Sarrazin in San Juan Capistrano, California. He had spent time in Africa and Latin America where he witnessed locals using bicycles to travel and carry items to remote areas. The company makes three different cargo bike types: compact, full size and front cargo. They also make an electric version of their bicycles, called an Electric Supermarché or an Mundo Electric. The bicycles are all manufactured from either steel or aluminum and they have a carrying capacity of 400 to 440 pounds.

Distribution 

The company's main storage facility in the United States is in Los Angeles. In Europe the warehouses are in Heidelberg, Germany and their European headquarters in Annecy, France. Yuba sells bicycles in Norway, Germany and Belgium. In 2020 they experienced supply chain issues with drive components from Bosch and Shimano. Bicycles are sold to 150 individual bicycle dealers and then assembled by the technicians of the sales outlets.

In 2020 Yuba bicycles named Patrick Cunnane as their president of Yuba Bicycles North American operations and Chief operating officer of global business. In 2019 Cunnane was a consultant for the company.

References 

Cycle manufacturers of the United States
American companies established in 2006
Companies based in California
2006 establishments in California